Club Deportivo Municipal de La Paz is a Bolivian football club based in La Paz. Founded on 20 October 1944, it currently plays in Liga de Fútbol Profesional Boliviano, holding home games at Estadio Luis Lastra, with a 10,000-seat capacity.

History
The club was founded in 1944 as Club Deportivo Municipal, and participated in the 1962, 1966, and 1974 Copa Libertadores.

Honours

National
Copa Simón Bolivar (Primera División): 1961, 1965
Copa Simón Bolivar (Segunda División): 1995

Performance in CONMEBOL competitions
Copa Libertadores: 3 appearances
1962 – First Round
1966 – First Round
1974 – First Round

References

Football clubs in La Paz
Association football clubs established in 1944
Deportivo Municipal
1944 establishments in Bolivia